The International Convention for the Safety of Life at Sea (SOLAS) is an international maritime treaty that sets minimum safety standards in the construction, equipment and operation of merchant ships. The International Maritime Organization convention requires signatory flag states to ensure that ships flagged by them comply with at least these standards.

The current version of SOLAS is the 1974 version, known as SOLAS 1974, which came into force on 25 May 1980. , SOLAS 1974 has 167 contracting states, which flag about 99% of merchant ships around the world in terms of gross tonnage.

SOLAS in its successive forms is generally regarded as the most important of all international treaties concerning the safety of merchant ships.

Signatories
The non-parties to SOLAS 1974 include numerous landlocked countries (for obvious reasons), as well as El Salvador, Micronesia and East Timor. Some others including Bolivia, Lebanon and Sri Lanka, all considered flag of convenience states, are deemed to have "potentially negative performance" regarding ratification.

Provisions 
SOLAS 1974 requires flag states to ensure that ships flagged by them comply with the minimum safety standards in the construction, equipment and operation of merchant ships. The treaty includes articles setting out general obligations, etc., followed by an annexe divided into twelve chapters, two new chapters were added in 2016 and 2017. Of these, chapter five (often called 'SOLAS V') is the only one that applies to all vessels on the sea, including private yachts and small craft on local trips as well as to commercial vessels on international passages. Many countries have turned these international requirements into national laws so that anybody on the sea who is in breach of SOLAS V requirements may find themselves subject to legal proceedings.

Chapter I – General Provisions Surveying the various types of ships and certifying that they meet the requirements of the convention.

Chapter II-1 – Construction – Subdivision and stability, machinery and electrical installations The subdivision of passenger ships into watertight compartments so that after damage to its hull, a vessel will remain afloat and stable.

Chapter II-2 – Fire protection, fire detection and fire extinction Fire safety provisions for all ships with detailed measures for passenger ships, cargo ships and tankers under the FSS Code and requirements for the carriage of gas as a fuel under the IGF Code

Chapter III – Life-saving appliances and arrangements Life-saving appliances and arrangements, including requirements for life boats, rescue boats and life jackets according to type of ship. The specific technical requirements are given in the International Life-Saving Appliance (LSA) Code.

Chapter IV – Radiocommunications The Global Maritime Distress Safety System (GMDSS) requires passenger and cargo ships on international voyages to carry radio equipment, including satellite Emergency Position Indicating Radio Beacons (EPIRBs) and Search and Rescue Transponders (SARTs).

Chapter V – Safety of navigation This chapter requires governments to ensure that all vessels are sufficiently and efficiently manned from a safety point of view. It places requirements on all vessels regarding voyage and passage planning, expecting a careful assessment of any proposed voyages by all who put to sea. Every mariner must take account of all potential dangers to navigation, weather forecasts, tidal predictions, the competence of the crew, and all other relevant factors. It also adds an obligation for all vessels' masters to offer assistance to those in distress and controls the use of lifesaving signals with specific requirements regarding danger and distress messages. It is different from the other chapters, which apply to certain classes of commercial shipping, in that these requirements apply to all vessels and their crews, including yachts and private craft, on all voyages and trips including local ones.

Chapter VI – Carriage of Cargoes Requirements for the stowage and securing of all types of cargo and cargo containers except liquids and gases in bulk.

Chapter VII – Carriage of dangerous goodsRequires the carriage of all kinds of dangerous goods to be in compliance with the International Bulk Chemical Code (IBC Code), The International Code of the Construction and Equipment of Ships Carrying Liquefied Gases in Bulk (IGC Code) and the International Maritime Dangerous Goods Code (IMDG Code).

Chapter VIII – Nuclear ships  Nuclear powered ships are required, particularly concerning radiation hazards, to conform to the Code of Safety for Nuclear Merchant Ships.

Chapter IX – Management for the Safe Operation of Ships Requires every shipowner and any person or company that has assumed responsibility for a ship to comply with the International Safety Management Code (ISM).

Chapter X – Safety measures for high-speed craft Makes mandatory the International Code of Safety for High-speed craft (HSC Code).

Chapter XI-1 – Special measures to enhance maritime Safety Requirements relating to organizations responsible for carrying out surveys and inspections, enhanced surveys, the ship identification number scheme, and operational requirements.

Chapter XI-2 – Special measures to enhance maritime security Includes the International Ship and Port Facility Security Code (ISPS Code). Confirms that the role of the Master in maintaining the security of the ship is not, and cannot be, constrained by the Company, the charterer or any other person. Port facilities must carry out security assessments and develop, implement and review port facility security plans. Controls the delay, detention, restriction, or expulsion of a ship from a port. Requires that ships must have a ship security alert system, as well as detailing other measures and requirements.

Chapter XII – Additional safety measures for bulk carriers Specific structural requirements for bulk carriers over 150 metres in length.

Chapter XIII - Verification of compliance Makes mandatory from 1 January 2016 the IMO Member State Audit Scheme.

Chapter XIV - Safety measures for ships operating in polar waters The chapter makes mandatory, from 1 January 2017, the Introduction and part I-A of the International Code for Ships Operating in Polar Waters (the Polar Code).

History

Origin and early versions 
The first version of SOLAS Treaty was passed in 1914 in response to the sinking of RMS Titanic, which prescribed numbers of lifeboats and other emergency equipment along with safety procedures, including continuous radio watches. The 1914 treaty never entered into force due to the outbreak of the First World War.

Further versions were adopted in 1929 and 1948.

1960 version 
The 1960 Convention was adopted on 17 June 1960 and entered into force on 26 May 1965. It was the fourth SOLAS Convention and was the first major achievement for International Maritime Organization (IMO). It represented a considerable step forward in modernizing regulations and keeping up with technical developments in the shipping industry.

1974 version 
In 1974 a completely new Convention was adopted to allow SOLAS to be amended and implemented within a reasonable timescale, instead of the previous procedure to incorporate amendments, which proved to be very slow. Under SOLAS 1960, it could take several years for amendments to come into force since countries had to give notice of acceptance to IMO and there was a minimum threshold of countries and tonnage. Under SOLAS 1974, amendments enter into force via a tacit acceptance procedure – this allows an amendment to enter into force on a specified date, unless objections to an amendment are received from an agreed number of parties.

The 1974 SOLAS came into force on 25 May 1980, 12 months after its ratification by at least 25 countries with at least 50% of gross tonnage. It has been updated and amended on numerous occasions since then and the Convention in force today is sometimes referred to as SOLAS, 1974, as amended.

In 1975 the assembly of the IMO decided that the 1974 convention should in future use SI (metric) units only.

1988 version 
In particular, amendments in 1988 based on amendments of International Radio Regulations in 1987 replaced Morse code with the Global Maritime Distress Safety System (GMDSS) and came into force beginning 1 February 1992. The issues covered by the treaty are set out in the list of sections (above).

Later amendments 
The up-to-date list of amendments to SOLAS is maintained by the IMO. Previous amendments were made in May 2011. In 2015, another later amendment is the SOLAS Container Weight Verification Regulation VI/2. This regulation, implemented by the IMO Maritime Safety Committee (MSC) requires that the full weight of loaded containers must be obtained prior to being onboarded on an ocean vessel. Communicating a weight value has called for the introduction of a new Electronic Data Interchange (EDI) communication protocol called VGM (Verified Gross Mass) or VERMAS (Verification of Mass), and involves cooperation between ocean carriers, Freight Forwarders/NVOCCs, EDI providers as well as exporters. The regulation states that exporters (shippers) are ultimately responsible to obtain a verified container weight. Originally scheduled for implementation on 1 July 2016, the regulation allows for flexibility and practical refinement according to the Maritime Safety Committee Memorandum #1548 to 1 October 2016.

See also

 International Ship and Port Facility Security Code (ISPS)
 Survival suit
 Oswego-Guardian/Texanita collision
 Automatic Identification System

References

External links
 International Life-Saving Appliance (LSA) Code – under the auspices of the International Convention for the Safety of Life at Sea (SOLAS) of 1 November 1974, (London, 4 June 1996)
 International Convention for the Safety of Life at Sea , Treaty in ECOLEX-the gateway to environmental law (English)
  USCG: Lifesaving & Fire Safety Division
 USCG Summary of IMO conventions
 IMO: Status of Conventions
 SOLAS: container weighing method 1 & 2
10 things you need to know about the new SOLAS regulations 

International Maritime Organization treaties
Rescue
Maritime communication
Maritime safety
Treaties concluded in 1914
Treaties concluded in 1929
Treaties concluded in 1948
Treaties concluded in 1960
Treaties concluded in 1974
Admiralty law treaties
Treaties of Algeria
Treaties of the People's Republic of Angola
Treaties of Antigua and Barbuda
Treaties of Argentina
Treaties of Australia
Treaties of Austria
Treaties of Azerbaijan
Treaties of the Bahamas
Treaties of Bahrain
Treaties of Bangladesh
Treaties of Barbados
Treaties of Belarus
Treaties of Belgium
Treaties of Belize
Treaties of the People's Republic of Benin
Treaties of the military dictatorship in Brazil
Treaties of Brunei
Treaties of the People's Republic of Bulgaria
Treaties of Myanmar
Treaties of Burundi
Treaties of Cambodia
Treaties of Cameroon
Treaties of Canada
Treaties of Cape Verde
Treaties of Chile
Treaties of the People's Republic of China
Treaties of Colombia
Treaties of the Democratic Republic of the Congo
Treaties of the Republic of the Congo
Treaties of the Cook Islands
Treaties of Ivory Coast
Treaties of Croatia
Treaties of Cuba
Treaties of Cyprus
Treaties of the Czech Republic
Treaties of Czechoslovakia
Treaties of Denmark
Treaties of Djibouti
Treaties of Dominica
Treaties of the Dominican Republic
Treaties of Ecuador
Treaties of Egypt
Treaties of El Salvador
Treaties of Equatorial Guinea
Treaties of Eritrea
Treaties of Estonia
Treaties of the Derg
Treaties of Fiji
Treaties of Finland
Treaties of France
Treaties of Gabon
Treaties of the Gambia
Treaties of Georgia (country)
Treaties of West Germany
Treaties of East Germany
Treaties of Ghana
Treaties of Greece
Treaties of Guatemala
Treaties of Guinea
Treaties of Guinea-Bissau
Treaties of Guyana
Treaties of Haiti
Treaties of Honduras
Treaties of the Hungarian People's Republic
Treaties of Iceland
Treaties of India
Treaties of Indonesia
Treaties of Iran
Treaties of Ba'athist Iraq
Treaties of Ireland
Treaties of Israel
Treaties of Italy
Treaties of Jamaica
Treaties of Japan
Treaties of Jordan
Treaties of Kazakhstan
Treaties of Kiribati
Treaties of North Korea
Treaties of South Korea
Treaties of Kuwait
Treaties of Latvia
Treaties of Lebanon
Treaties of Liberia
Treaties of the Libyan Arab Jamahiriya
Treaties of Lithuania
Treaties of Luxembourg
Treaties of Madagascar
Treaties of Malawi
Treaties of Malaysia
Treaties of the Maldives
Treaties of Malta
Treaties of the Marshall Islands
Treaties of Mauritania
Treaties of Mauritius
Treaties of Mexico
Treaties of Monaco
Treaties of Montenegro
Treaties of Morocco
Treaties of Mozambique
Treaties of Nauru
Treaties of the Netherlands
Treaties of New Zealand
Treaties of Nigeria
Treaties of Niue
Treaties of Norway
Treaties of Oman
Treaties of Pakistan
Treaties of Palau
Treaties of Panama
Treaties of Papua New Guinea
Treaties of Peru
Treaties of the Philippines
Treaties of the Polish People's Republic
Treaties of Portugal
Treaties of Qatar
Treaties of the Socialist Republic of Romania
Treaties of Saint Kitts and Nevis
Treaties of Saint Lucia
Treaties of Saint Vincent and the Grenadines
Treaties of Samoa
Treaties of São Tomé and Príncipe
Treaties of Saudi Arabia
Treaties of Serbia and Montenegro
Treaties of Senegal
Treaties of Seychelles
Treaties of Sierra Leone
Treaties of Singapore
Treaties of Slovakia
Treaties of Slovenia
Treaties of South Africa
Treaties of the Soviet Union
Treaties of Spain
Treaties of Sri Lanka
Treaties of the Republic of the Sudan (1985–2011)
Treaties of Suriname
Treaties of Sweden
Treaties of Switzerland
Treaties of Tanzania
Treaties of Thailand
Treaties of Togo
Treaties of Tonga
Treaties of Trinidad and Tobago
Treaties of Tunisia
Treaties of Turkey
Treaties of Turkmenistan
Treaties of Tuvalu
Treaties of the Ukrainian Soviet Socialist Republic
Treaties of the United Arab Emirates
Treaties of the United Kingdom
Treaties of the United States
Treaties of Uruguay
Treaties of Vanuatu
Treaties of Venezuela
Treaties of Vietnam
Treaties of the Yemen Arab Republic
Treaties of Yugoslavia
RMS Titanic
Treaties extended to the Isle of Man
Treaties extended to the Cayman Islands
Treaties extended to Bermuda
Treaties extended to Gibraltar
Treaties extended to Guernsey
Treaties extended to Jersey
Treaties extended to the Falkland Islands
Treaties extended to Anguilla
Treaties extended to Montserrat
Treaties extended to the British Virgin Islands
Treaties extended to Saint Helena, Ascension and Tristan da Cunha
Treaties extended to the Turks and Caicos Islands
Treaties extended to the Netherlands Antilles
Treaties extended to Aruba
Treaties extended to Greenland
Treaties extended to the Faroe Islands
Treaties extended to Portuguese Macau
Treaties extended to British Hong Kong
Navigational aids